Centennial High School is a high school in Calgary, Alberta, Canada, teaching grades 10 through 12. The school's name was chosen as a reference to the 100th birthday of the province of Alberta in 2005, as the construction of the school was finished that year. The school opened for students to attend in 2004, while the school was still undergoing construction. The school is part of the Action for Bright Children Society.

Notable alumni

 Alexa Gray (class of 2012), professional volleyball player

References

External links

Centennial's school website
School profile on the Calgary Board of Education website

High schools in Calgary
Educational institutions established in 2004
2004 establishments in Alberta